Shub may refer to:

 Shub (surname), people with the surname
 DJ Shub, Canadian music producer

See also
 Blum Blum Shub, pseudorandom number generator
 Shub-Niggurath, deity in the Cthulhu Mythos
 Shub-Niggurath (band), avant-rock/zeuhl band from France